Tossea is a genus of moths belonging to the subfamily Tortricinae of the family Tortricidae. It consists of only one species, Tossea setosa, which is found in Ecuador (Pichincha Province).

The wingspan is about 19.5 mm. The ground colour of the forewings is ochreous cream preserved in the form of spots forming a subterminal line. The remaining area is blackish brown. The hindwings are cream, slightly mixed with ochreous posteriorly and with numerous grey strigulae.

Etymology
The generic name is an anagram of the name of the name of the typespecies. The specific name refers to the setose end of the sacculus.

See also
List of Tortricidae genera

References

Euliini